The Bali Times is Bali's only English-language newspaper, published in broadsheet format. The first edition appeared on March 18, 2005. Its contents include Bali, national and international news; commentary; columns, features; health; business; the arts; and sport.

The newspaper is published by PT. Lestari Kala Media in Seminyak, Bali.

External links
 Official website
 The Bali Times on Facebook
 The Bali Times on Twitter

Newspapers published in Indonesia
Mass media in Bali
Newspapers established in 2005